Nicholas Alexander Johnson (born December 22, 1992) is an American professional basketball player for the Beijing Ducks of the Chinese Basketball Association (CBA). He played college basketball for the Arizona Wildcats before being drafted 42nd overall by the Houston Rockets in the 2014 NBA draft.

High school career
Johnson attended Highland High School in Gilbert, Arizona from 2007 to 2009, before transferring to Findlay Prep in Henderson, Nevada for his junior year. As a junior in 2009–10, he averaged 14.1 points, 4.6 rebounds and 3.4 assists per game as he led Findlay to a 32-2 record.

In November 2010, he signed a National Letter of Intent to play college basketball at the University of Arizona.

As a senior in 2010–11, he averaged 24.8 points, 6.5 rebounds and 4.7 assists per game as he led Findlay to a 28-4 record. He was ranked as the No. 40 overall prospect in the country and the No. 8 shooting guard by Rivals.com to go with a scout grade of 96 by ESPN.com. He went on to be named a Long Beach Press-Telegram Best in the West first-team selection.

College career
In his freshman season at Arizona, Johnson was named to the 2012 Pac-12 All-Freshman team. In 35 games, he averaged 8.9 points, 3.3 rebounds and 2.4 assists in 28.1 minutes per game.

In his sophomore season, he earned honorable mention Pac-12 All-Defensive Team honors. At the Pac-12 Tournament in Las Vegas, he averaged a team-best 14.0 points to go with 4.0 assists and 2.0 rebounds per game. In 35 games, he averaged 11.5 points, 3.6 rebounds, 3.2 assists and 1.9 steals in 31.4 minutes per game.

In his junior season, he earned first-team All-Pac-12 and Pac-12 All-Defensive team honors, as well as being named the Pac-12 Player of the Year. He finished his career ranked 24th on UA's scoring list with 1,333 points. In 38 games, he averaged 16.3 points, 4.1 rebounds, 2.8 assists and 1.1 steals in 33.1 minutes per game.

On April 15, 2014, he declared for the NBA draft, foregoing his final year of college eligibility.

Professional career

Houston Rockets (2014–2015)
On June 26, 2014, Johnson was selected with the 42nd overall pick in the 2014 NBA draft by the Houston Rockets. On July 25, 2014, he signed with the Rockets after averaging 12.5 points per game during the 2014 NBA Summer League. During his rookie season, he received multiple assignments to the Rio Grande Valley Vipers of the NBA Development League.

On July 20, 2015, the Rockets traded Johnson, Joey Dorsey, Kostas Papanikolaou, Pablo Prigioni, a 2016 first-round draft pick, and cash considerations to the Denver Nuggets in exchange for Ty Lawson and a 2017 second-round draft pick. On October 24, 2015, he was waived by the Nuggets after appearing in six preseason games.

Austin Spurs (2015–2016)
On December 28, 2015, Johnson was acquired by the Austin Spurs of the NBA Development League. In 34 games for Austin in 2015–16, he averaged 10.4 points, 3.7 rebounds, 3.0 assists and 1.0 steals per game.

On September 8, 2016, Johnson signed with the Orlando Magic, but was waived on October 22 after appearing in four preseason games.

Bayern Munich (2016–2017)
On October 29, 2016, Johnson signed with Bayern Munich of the German Basketball Bundesliga till the end of the season.

Second Stint with Austin Spurs (2017–2019)
On November 2, 2017, Johnson was included in the 2017–18 opening night roster for Austin Spurs. He helped the Austin Spurs win the G League championship and was named the G League Finals MVP.

He was signed by the San Antonio Spurs and played four preseason games before being waived. On November 18, 2018, he was reacquired by the Austin Spurs.

Wisconsin Herd (2019)
On January 16, 2019, Johnson was acquired by the Wisconsin Herd with returning right of Olivier Hanlan and a second-round pick in the 2019 NBA G League Draft for Travis Trice.

Nanterre 92 (2019)
On March 22, 2019, Johnson signed with Nanterre 92.

Türk Telekom (2019–2021)
On September 5, 2019, he signed with Türk Telekom of Turkish Super League. Johnson averaged 11.6 points, 3.7 rebounds and 4.3 assists per game. He re-signed with the team on October 27, 2020.

Second Stint with Nanterre 92 (2021–2022)
On July 30, 2021, he has signed with Nanterre 92 of the LNB Pro A.

NBA career statistics

Regular season

|-
| style="text-align:left;"| 
| style="text-align:left;"| Houston
| 28 || 0 || 9.4 || .347 || .238 || .680 || 1.4 || .4 || .3 || .1 || 2.6
|-
|- class="sortbottom"
| style="text-align:center;" colspan=2| Career
| 28 || 0 || 9.4 || .347 || .238 || .680 || 1.4 || .4 || .3 || .1 || 2.6
|}

Playoffs

|-
| style="text-align:left;"| 2015
| style="text-align:left;"| Houston
| 9 || 0 || 5.4 || .235 || .143 || 1.000 || .4 || .4 || .0 || .1 || 1.3
|-
|- class="sortbottom"
| style="text-align:center;" colspan=2| Career
| 9 || 0 || 5.4 || .235 || .143 || 1.000 || .4 || .4 || .0 || .1 || 1.3

Personal life
Johnson's father, Joey, and his uncle, Dennis, are both former professional basketball players with the latter being a three-time NBA champion and a member of the Naismith Memorial Basketball Hall of Fame.

References

External links

Arizona Wildcats bio

1992 births
Living people
21st-century African-American sportspeople
African-American basketball players
All-American college men's basketball players
American expatriate basketball people in France
American expatriate basketball people in Germany
American expatriate basketball people in Turkey
American men's basketball players
Arizona Wildcats men's basketball players
Austin Spurs players
Basketball players from Arizona
FC Bayern Munich basketball players
Findlay Prep alumni
Houston Rockets draft picks
Houston Rockets players
Nanterre 92 players
People from Gilbert, Arizona
Point guards
Rio Grande Valley Vipers players
Shooting guards
Sportspeople from the Phoenix metropolitan area
Türk Telekom B.K. players
United States men's national basketball team players
Wisconsin Herd players